Ranasinghe Arachchilage Ajantha Sarath Kumara Ranasinghe (30 May 1940 – 27 February 2016), popularly as Ajantha Ranasinghe, was an award winning Sri Lankan journalist, lyricist, poet, and novelist. Considered one of the most iconic and prolific lyricists ever produced in the country, over the course of a 40 year career he contributed to nearly 60 films and more than 400 songs.

Personal life
Ajantha Ranasinghe was born on 30 May 1940 in Thalammahara, a small village in the Kurunegala district. After obtaining his primary education at the Pannala Government School, he moved to Colombo and resumed his studies at St. John's College, Nugegoda. He left after completing the GCE Ordinary Level Exams.

Ranasinghe was married to daughter of late singer Kokiladevi Weeratunga, Sarojini Weeratunge.

Journalist career
Ranasinghe's uncle Asoka Pieris was a well known dramatist, and he came under his influence and through that got to showcase his talent over the airwaves. At a very young age, Ranasinghe wrote Buddhist songs to the Lama Mandapaya, a program on Radio Ceylon hosted by Karunaratne Abeysekera. He participated in another program, Radio Magazine, organised by the filmmaker K. A. W. Perera. His first published work, Thivanka Rekha, a poetry collection, came out in 1964.

He wrote poetry and short stories for the children's pages of Silumina and Peramuna. His poetry was frequently published in Silumina, Vanitha Viththi, and Lankadeepa. Eventually he was selected as a staff reporter at Dinamina. He would graduate from and to the posts of Sub Editor, Local News Editor, Additional Chief Sub Editor, Chief Sub Editor, Features Editor, and Chief Editor of Navayugaya.

Career as a lyricist
After three decades in journalism, Ranasinghe began writing lyrics for popular singers. His verses became highly popular among the public. Award after award followed, from the Sarasaviya, OCIC, State Literary, Raigam, Sumathi, and Kumaratunga Munidasa ceremonies. In addition to being a lyricist, Ranasinghe was also a B Grade Radio Ceylon singer.

Landmarks
 25 years as an Editor at Lake House
 Provincial News Editor and Local News Editor at Dinamina
 Features Editor of Janatha
 Editor in Chief of Nawayugaya
 Consultant at the Sri Lanka Broadcasting Corporation (SLBC)
 President's Award for Best Song Writer of the Year on three occasions
 Lifetime Achievement Award in Journalism Awards for Excellence Programme, organised by the Editor's Guild of Sri Lanka – 2014
 A song festival Ajantha Geethavalokana was held at the Sri Lanka Foundation Institute at Independent Square on 9 May 2002
 A collection of his songs released in 2002 in a new cassette and CD titled Kalpana Vijithaya
 A second CD collection released in 2013 titled Ran Kenden

Death
Ranasinghe died at the Colombo National Hospital on 27 February 2016 after a minor accident right opposite his house three days earlier. His remains were kept at No. 11/4, Ranasinghe Mawatha, Hiripitiya, Pannipitiya at his son's residence. The funeral was held on 29 February 2016 at the Borella Cemetery.

Author work
Landuni Mata Varam Natha (1975)
Vinkal Bass (1978)
Kristhuni Karunakara Manawa (1995)
Sihina Kumara Saha Othamo (2009)
Thunpath Rata 
Thiwanka Rekha 
Janakanthayinge Manakantha Katha

Filmography
Dr. Ranasinghe contributed over 300 lyrics to Sinhala films since 1976 with his debut, Wasana.

Notable lyrics
Ajantha Ranasinghe wrote more than 400 lyrics for singers across several generations.

Adara Samarum Ketiwu
Adaraneeya Wasanthe
Api Ayeth Hamu
Asha Nirasha Mawu
Bodhiye Viharaye'Bol Vee AhuruBonda Meedum KadurelleBudun Methun Lowa UththamaDaesama RiddanaDawasak ThiyewiDegoda Thala Ganga GalaDineka MathudaDuhul Meedume Sihil MarutheDuras Wannata Me LesinDuwa Maa WageGame Kopi KadeGanga JaleGela Wata Banda WuHanga GalleneHindi VadanHiru NonegeewaIgillila Yanna YanIndunil GangulalIrata Udin Sakwalata UdinIra UdinIra Wata Yana GirawunIthin AneKalpana Lowa Mal WaneKanden EhaKeena Dam MitakKiri Kawadi SinaKiri Sudu SeleKoho Koho Kohe IdanKurullo Nube ThalenMage DinapothehiMage Kadulin NimawuMage Lowata ObaMalanika MathakayenMal Parawena LokeMal Pokuru PokuruMala Giraa GelaMangala Mal DamaMata Mani WageMata WasanaMe Ayurin ApiMe Mai Gaha YataMe Pasal Meda MidulaiMe Seetha NilleMidule Athana NangoMuthumenike Ude RayinNinda Nena RathriyeNiranjala KatadoNirwana Swarna DwarayenPaalu SusaanePaloswaka Sanda PayanuParami Dam PuramuPata Podak ThilakalaPem RajadahanePemathura HengumPokuru Pokuru Mal Senakili Punchi Dawas WalaRa Dolos PayeRa Duru Rata MeRa Pal RakinaRa Vee La Ai Me UdeRali Palama Sudu PatataRallen Rallata Pawena OruweRana Hansa YuwalaRan Kenden BedaRaththaran Pem PuraneRuwan Wala WimaneSalalihiniyoSanda Sangi (Praveena teledrama song)Sath Ruwan WassaSeegiri LanduneSihala KalakaruwaneniSihina Nelum MalSili Sili Seethala AlleSiri Bo MedaSithata Danena Me LathawulSudu Sesathak WanSuwanda Dani DanenawaSuwanda Dena MalwaneTharu ArundatiUkulata NawathVeedi Kone Mawatha AddaraWala Theerayen EhaWanka GiriyaWerale Muhuru WalleVilluda Punchi DepaYaluwe Sithin HadannepaYadha Bime Awi''

References

External links
 
Funeral of Late Ajantha Ranasinghe
Filmography as a lyricist
President Wishes Songwriter Dr Ajantha Ranasinghe
Popular Lyrics Ajantha Ranasinghe shows
For Ajantha Ranasinghe
අජන්තා ගැන තවත් නොකී කතා
වසර 56කට පෙර කවියට නැඟුණු අජන්තාගේ අප‍‍්‍රකාශිත පේ‍‍්‍රමය

1940 births
2016 deaths
People from Kurunegala
People from British Ceylon
Sinhalese journalists
Sri Lankan lyricists